RetroMania Wrestling is a professional wrestling video game by RetroSoft Studios. The game was released on April 1, 2021. The game was created as an homage to classic WWF arcade games WWF Superstars and WWF WrestleFest.

Gameplay 
RetroMania Wrestling simulates professional wrestling matches. Multiple game modes are included. In the 'Story Mode', you play as Johnny Retro (aka John Morrison). Branching dialogue trees gives you choices of whom to befriend and whom to backstab. 10 Pounds of Gold' is a standard tournament where you try to reach Nick Aldis to win the NWA Worlds Heavyweight Championship. A Royal Rumble-style match is included as 'Retro Rumble', where 16 men compete. As well as a Versus mode with a match customization, including tag team and cage match.

RetroMania's grappling system is timing-based, similar to that of the Fire Pro Wrestling series. The game features a light, medium, and heavy grapple moves. Strong grapple moves can only be completed after your character's momentum bar fills. Each wrestler also possesses standing strikes, running attacks, running counterattacks, ground attacks, and moves from the top turnbuckle.

Characters
The game features a mixture of 16 wrestlers from different promotions, including New Japan Pro Wrestling, Impact Wrestling, and the independent circuit. The playable characters include Tommy Dreamer, Colt Cabana, Nick Aldis, Matt Cardona, Brian Myers, and John Morrison, as wells as groups like the Blue World Order and the Road Warriors. RetroSoft Studios has promised additional characters will be added through DLC, including James Storm, Mr. Hughes and Chris Bey. As of January 2023 only Chris Bey has been released.

Reception
RetroMania is faithful to its inspiration, with the right kind of modern updates needed to bring it up to modern gaming standards, according to Paste. NintendoLife claims that the game will get a cult following, but feels like a prototype. NintendoLife also criticized the length of the story, claiming it was too short.

See also

List of licensed wrestling video games
List of fighting games

References

External links
 Official Website

PlayStation 4 games
Professional wrestling games
2021 video games
Video games developed in the United States
Multiplayer and single-player video games
Nintendo Switch games
Retro-style video games
Video games based on real people
Windows games
Xbox One games